Sphenomorphus wau is a species of skink found in Papua New Guinea.

References

wau
Reptiles described in 2021
Skinks of New Guinea